Macy Gardner is an Australian netball player who has played for Queensland Firebirds in Suncorp Super Netball and for Queensland Fusion in the Australian Netball League.

Early life, education and family
Gardner is originally from Victoria but moved to Queensland  when her mother, Roselee Jencke, was appointed head coach of Queensland Firebirds. Her uncle, Ray Jencke, is a former Australian rules footballer. Between 2013 and 2017 Gardner attended All Hallows' School and between 2018 and 2021 she attended Griffith University.

Playing career

Queensland
Gardner has represented Queensland  at both under-17 and under-19 levels in the Australian National Netball Championships. In 2019 she was named the MVP in the  under-19 tournament.

Queensland Fusion
In 2016 and 2017 Gardner was named as a Queensland Fusion training partner. In 2018 and 2019 season she played for Fusion in the Australian Netball League.

Queensland Firebirds
On 27 July 2019 Gardner made her debut for Queensland Firebirds in a 2019 Suncorp Super Netball Round 10 match against Sunshine Coast Lightning. In an eight minute appearance she made four goal assists and six feeds and intercepted a Laura Langman pass. She was subsequently included in the Firebirds squad for the 2020 Suncorp Super Netball season.

References

Living people
Australian netball players
Netball players from Victoria (Australia)
Netball players from Queensland
Queensland Fusion players
Queensland Sapphires players
Queensland Firebirds players
Australian Netball League players
Suncorp Super Netball players
People educated at All Hallows' School
Griffith University alumni
Year of birth missing (living people)
Queensland state netball league players